= The Very Hush Hush =

American band

Background information
- Origin: Golden, Colorado
- Genres: Indie; Shoegazer; Rock; Electronica
- Years active: 2003–present
- Labels: Sao Bento Music
- Members: P. B. Rappmund; G. H. Outerbridge

The Very Hush Hush (TVHH) is a band originally from Colorado.

== History ==
The Very Hush Hush formed in 1998 in Golden, Colorado. The band's original lineup consisted of drums and synthesizers. In 2003, TVHH added drummer Symons for work on a first set of studio songs.

Symons left the band after the release of a self-titled EP. Soon thereafter, TVHH recorded a follow up EP entitled Washing Songs with new drummer, Salg.

Salg left TVHH in 2004 for Denver band Killfix. The Very Hush Hush followed Washing Songs with another EP, Sign Language that included the song "Love, Like Love" which later appeared on their first full-length album. Sign Language was followed by a full LP, Mourir C'est Facile (2005). A west coast tour commenced to support the album with the aid of label-mates Merrell and Selvage from Tin Tin. An east coast tour followed in 2006.

TVHH released a second LP entitled, Evil Milk, in 2008 on Sao Bento Records.

== Discography ==
=== Albums ===
- Mourir C'est Facile (November 2005)
- Evil Milk (February 2008)

=== Singles and EPs ===
- The Very Hush Hush (2003) - EP
- Washing Songs (2003) - EP
- Sign Language (2004) - EP

=== Appearances on compilations ===
- Public Service 1 (2004)
- Adcouvrir Absolument Volume 5 (2004)
- Adcouvrir Absolument Volume 8 (2005)
